The Oklahoma Secretary of Health is a member of the Oklahoma Governor's Cabinet. The Secretary is appointed by the Governor, with the consent of the Oklahoma Senate, to serve at the pleasure of the Governor. The Secretary serves as the chief advisor to the Governor on public health issues and needs.

The current Secretary of Health is Howard Hendrick, who was appointed by Governor Brad Henry in 2003.

History
The position of Secretary of Human Services was established in 2003 when Governor Brad Henry issued an executive order splitting the former position of Secretary of Health and Human Services into the separate positions of Secretary of Health and Secretary of Human Services. The previous position was established, along with the Oklahoma Governor's Cabinet, by the Executive Branch Reform Act of 1986. The Act directs the Secretary of Human Services to advise the Governor on public assistance policy and advise the state public assistance agencies on new policy as directed by the Governor.

Dual Position
Oklahoma state law always for Cabinet Secretaries to serve concurrently as the head of a State agency in addition to their duties as a Cabinet Secretary. Historically, the Secretary of Human Services has also served as either the Director of the Oklahoma Department of Human Services. As of 2010, all Human Services Secretaries have served in that dual positions.

Responsibilities
The Secretary of Human Services oversees most public assistance programs offered by the State. Such programs include child care services, senior citizen assistance, child custody services, disability vocational services, and services to the blind and deaf. The Secretary also oversees services to juveniles, both treatment and corrections.

As of fiscal year 2011, the Secretary of Human Services oversees 9,115 full-time employees and is responsible for an annual budget of over $2.4 billion.

Agencies overseen
The Secretary of Human Services oversees the following state entities:
Department of Human Services
Department of Rehabilitation Services
Office of Juvenile Affairs

Salary
The annual salary for the position of Secretary of Human Services set by State law at $80,000. Despite this, if the Secretary serves as the head of State agency, the Secretary receives the higher of the two salaries. Incumbent Secretary Howard Henrick serves as the Director of the Department of Human Services. As such, she receives the salary allowed for that position. As of 2010, the annual salary for that position is $163,000.

List of Secretaries

References

External links
 Members of the Governor's Cabinet
 State biography of Cabinet Secretary Howard Hendrick

Human Services
Human Services, Secretary of